Andrew Ilie (born 18 April 1976) is a former tennis player.  Ilie fled Romania at age 10 with his family, spending a year at a refugee camp in Austria before emigrating to Australia. He turned professional in 1994 and became a citizen of Australia. He 
was an Australian Institute of Sport scholarship holder.	He won two ATP Tour singles titles (Coral Springs in 1998 and Atlanta in 2000), as well as five Challenger Series tournaments. Ilie reached his career-high singles ranking of World No. 38 on 29 May 2000.

Career

Juniors
He reached the finals of the Australian Open Jrs in 1994.

Pro Tour
Ilie never progressed past the fourth round of a Grand Slam tournament, but was a fan-favorite, especially in Australia.  Described in 2001 by tennis writer Jon Wertheim as "an emerging cult hero", Ilie developed an avid following whenever he played at the Australian Open in Melbourne. He became well known for adventurous and occasionally outrageous shots, and by ripping his shirt in glee whenever he won a particularly important or hard-fought match. The latter ritual began at the French Open in 1999, as Ilie celebrated his first-round victory in five sets over Jonas Bjorkman, and then repeated the gesture after his second-round victory, also in five sets, over Martin Rodriguez.

The last years of Ilie's career were marred by persistent injuries, including chronic osteitis pubis, which hampered his play. Ilie retired in November 2004. Following retirement, Ilie married and settled in Hong Kong.

Junior Grand Slam finals

Singles: 1 (1 runner-up)

ATP career finals

Singles: 3 (2 titles, 1 runner-ups)

ATP Challenger and ITF Futures finals

Singles: 8 (6–2)

Doubles: 2 (0–2)

Performance timeline

Singles

References

External links
 
 
 

Australian expatriates in Hong Kong
Australian male tennis players
Australian people of Romanian descent
Naturalised citizens of Australia
Naturalised tennis players
Olympic tennis players of Australia
Tennis players from Bucharest
Romanian emigrants to Australia
Romanian refugees
Tennis players from Melbourne
Tennis players at the 2000 Summer Olympics
Living people
1976 births
People educated at Mentone Grammar School
Australian Institute of Sport tennis players